Pydikondala Manikyala Rao (1 November 1961 – 1 August 2020) was an Indian politician. He was a Member of Legislative Assembly for Tadepalligudem and former Endowments Minister for Andhra Pradesh (from 2014 – March 2018).

Life
He was a member of the Bharatiya Janata Party. Rao died on 1 August 2020, at a hospital in Vijayawada after having been taken ill with COVID-19 a week prior during the COVID-19 pandemic in India.

References

External links

1961 births
2020 deaths
People from West Godavari district
Bharatiya Janata Party politicians from Andhra Pradesh
Telugu politicians
Andhra Pradesh MLAs 2014–2019
State cabinet ministers of Andhra Pradesh
National Democratic Alliance candidates in the 2019 Indian general election
Deaths from the COVID-19 pandemic in India